Firemen's Tower (Hungarian: Tűzoltótorony) is a 47 m high tower in Satu Mare, Romania built in 1904 at the recommendation of bishop Gyula Meszlényi. The architect of the tower was Ferencz Dittler and the builder Lajos Vajnay. 

The tower was used, because of its height, as a fire spotter by the firemen. Today the tower is a tourist attraction visited by around 100 visitors per day.

References

External links
Official site

Towers in Romania
Buildings and structures in Satu Mare
History of Satu Mare
Tourist attractions in Satu Mare
Historic monuments in Satu Mare County